Stigmella aurora is a moth of the family Nepticulidae. It is found in the region from eastern Russia to the eastern part of the Palearctic realm.

The larvae feed on Crataegus pinnatifida. They probably mine the leaves of their host.

External links
Fauna Europaea

Nepticulidae
Moths of Asia
Moths described in 1984